Lhuntse District (Dzongkha: ལྷུན་རྩེ་རྫོང་ཁག་; Wylie: Lhun-rtse rdzong-khag; previously "Lhuntshi") is one of the 20 dzongkhag (districts) comprising Bhutan. It consists of 2506 households. Located in the northeast, Lhuntse is one of the least developed dzhongkhags of Bhutan. There are few roads, the first gas station was opened in September 2005, electricity is not well distributed, and the difficult terrain makes distribution of social welfare problematic. Despite its favourable climate, farming is hindered by the lack of infrastructure.

Culture
Lhuntse is culturally part of eastern Bhutan. The languages and lifestyle of its inhabitants may be contrasted against the dominant western Ngalop culture.

This region is renowned as a textiles producing region and as the ancestral homeland of the Bhutanese royal family.

Alcohol 
Eastern Bhutanese culture is distinctive in its high alcohol consumption in relation to other parts of Bhutan. Ara, the traditional alcohol of Bhutan, is most often home made from rice or maize, either fermented or distilled. It may only be legally produced and consumed privately. Ara production is unregulated in method and quality. Its sale has been prohibited in Bhutan and enforced since a severe crackdown. However, because Ara returns far more profit than other forms of maize, many Bhutanese farmers have pressed for legal reform.

The Bhutanese government, meanwhile, is intent on discouraging excessive alcohol consumption, abuse, and associated diseases through taxation and regulation.

Through government efforts to reduce ara production and consumption in Lhuntse District, locals conceded in 2011 that something should be done to curb the distinctly eastern Bhutanese tradition of heavy drinking. The government's strategy is to reduce ara production and consumption gradually until it is eliminated. Alcoholism and ara production have been notable topics of political discussion Bhutan, especially at the local level. Ara, however, is culturally relevant for its religious and medicinal uses. In 2011, the government passed its Alcohol Control Regulation, which imposed up to three times the previous taxes on alcohol. As a result, alcohol sales have dropped and prices have risen.

Languages
Lhuntse is home to a variety of language groups. In the east, Dzala an East Bodish language, is spoken. In southern Lhuntse, Chocangacakha, a sister language to Dzongkha, is spoken. The northern and western parts of the district are known as the Kurtö region, where inhabitants speak the East Bodish Kurtöp language.

Administrative divisions

Lhuntse District is divided into eight village blocks (or gewogs):

Gangzur Gewog
Jaray Gewog
Khoma Gewog
Kurtoe Gewog
Menbi Gewog
Metsho Gewog
Minjay Gewog
Tsenkhar Gewog

Within these divisions are individual villages with small populations such as Autsho.

Geography
Most of Lhuntse District is part of the environmentally protected areas of Bhutan. The district contains parts of Wangchuck Centennial Park in the north (the gewogs of Gangzur, Khoma and Kurtoe), Thrumshingla National Park in the south (the gewogs of Gangzur, Jarey and Metsho), and Bumdeling Wildlife Sanctuary in the east (the gewogs of Khoma and Minjay). These three parks are connected by biological corridors that crisscross the central and southern regions of the district.

Gallery

Towns and settlements in Lhunste District
Khenpa Dzong

See also
Districts of Bhutan
Khoma
Kurtöp language
Kurtoed Province

References

External links
Dzongkhag profile with map over gewogs
Windhorsephotography Lhutse gallery
Kuensel Online; September 23, 2005: Lhuntse's first gas station

 
Districts of Bhutan
Drugs in Bhutan